Sri Krishna Satya is a 1971 Indian Telugu-language Hindu mythological film directed by K. V. Reddy. It stars N. T. Rama Rao and Jayalalithaa, with music composed by Pendyala. The film was produced by N. Trivikrama Rao. It was the last film directed by the noted filmmaker K. V. Reddy.

Sri Krishna Satya released on 24 December 1971 and was commercially successful. The film won the Nandi Award for Second Best Feature Film for the year 1971. Jayalalithaa won the Filmfare Award for Best Actress – Telugu for the year 1972. The film was dubbed into Hindi as Tuhi Ram Tuhi Krishna.

Plot
The film begins at Tretayuga when Rama breaks the Siva Dhanusu bow of Siva. Whereat, he is adored & endeared by a Nagakanya Chandrasena, who is seized by 
Mahiravana the king of Patalalanka. During the time of the battle, Ravana bells Mahiravana who pledges to slaughter Ramalakshmana by the next morning. Being cognizant of it, Anjaneya is under his surveillance shielding Ramalakshmana. However, Mahiravana forges as Vibhishana and abducts Ramalakshmana by transforming them into statues. Outraged, Anjaneya lands at Pathalalanka. At that point, he Knowledges via Narada that it's certainly not to slay Mahiravana as his spirit is camouflage. 

Ergo, Anjaneya seeks Chandrasena’s aid. In return, she urges a vow that his god should be her. Anjaneya vouchsafes it, without knowledge of her wish. As of now, Chandrasena breaks out of the puzzle when Rama kills Mahiravana. Following this, Rama is aware of Chandrasena's desire to knit him which is against the nature of Rama's Avatar. So, he bestows her a boon to comply with it in her incarnation as Satyabhama at Dwaparayuga.

Eras roll by, and Rama takes the avatar as Krishna who splices Satyabhama as per his word. Besides, vainglory, self-respected, egotistic Satyabhama is proprietorial to her husband who wants to acquire all his love. Hence, to edify her Narada drives a game to perform a ritual Sri Krishna Tulabharam i.e., to donate her husband and recoup him by weighing him with his equivalent gold. In that, Satyabhama fails when she discerns the deity will yield only to devotion. Accordingly, she bows her head down before Rukmini who weighs him with Tulasidalam the Basil leaf. 

Later, Krishna proceeds as an embassy of Pandava with the Kaurava when Satyabhama appears as his devotee. Currently, the parley falls, and the devil tries to grab the lord, who backs divulging his Vishwaroopam, the entire world forms in him. Finally, the movie ends with Krishna preaching Bhagavad Gita to Arjuna.

Cast

 N. T. Rama Rao as Lord Rama, Lord Krishna and Ravana (triple role)
 Jayalalithaa as Satyabhama and Chandrasena (dual role)
 Devika as Rukmini
 S. V. Ranga Rao as Duryodhana and Mahiravana (dual role)
 Kanta Rao as Narada Maharshi
 Padmanabham as Vasanthaiah
 V. Nagayya as Dhrutarashtra
 Rajanala as Satrajit
 Dhulipala as Karna
 Mikkilineni as Bhishma
 Ramana Reddy
 Prabhakar Reddy as Aswatthama
 Nagaraju as Lakshmana and Satyaki (dual role)
 Arja Janardhana Rao as Lord Hanuman
 Tyagaraju as Ahiravana
 S. Varalakshmi as Draupadi
 Rushyendramani as Gandhari
 Sandhya Rani as Nalini
 Y. Vijaya as Jambavati
 Balakrishna as member of Yadava clan 
 Chalapathi Rao as member of Yadava clan

Production 
N. T. Rama Rao approached K. V. Reddy and told him that he had two scripts written by his collaborator Pingali  Chanakya Chandragupta and Sri Krishna Satya. He offered K. V. Reddy the choice of directing either of the films for Rama Rao's production house. K. V. Reddy chose the latter. The plot of Sri Krishna Satya is linked to both Treta Yuga and Dvapara Yuga. The film stars N. T. Rama Rao as Lord Krishna and Jayalalithaa as his consort Satyabhama. After shooting a large part of the film, K. V. Reddy fell ill. Then, Rama Rao finished the remaining portions under the supervision of K. V. Reddy.

Music

Music was composed by Pendyala Nageswara Rao.

Awards
Nandi Award for Second Best Feature Film - Silver - N. Trivikrama Rao
Filmfare Award for Best Actress – Telugu - Jayalalithaa

References

Bibliography

External links
 

1972 films
Films directed by K. V. Reddy
Films based on the Mahabharata
Films scored by Pendyala Nageswara Rao
1970s Telugu-language films
Films based on mythology
Films based on the Bhagavata Purana